Flint Run Archeological District, also known as the Flint Run Complex, is a historic archaeological site complex and national historic district located near Front Royal, Warren County, Virginia. The district consists of a group of Clovis sites clustered around a jasper outcrop in the Shenandoah Valley.  They relate to a group of between 500 and 1000 people who occupied the site about 8300 BC. Archaeological excavations reveal habitations and stone tool workshops.

It was listed on the National Register of Historic Places in 1976.

References

Archaeological sites on the National Register of Historic Places in Virginia
Historic districts on the National Register of Historic Places in Virginia
National Register of Historic Places in Warren County, Virginia